Rosemary Henderson (born 1961), also known as Rose, is an Irish actor. She is known for playing Sister Assumpta in the Father Ted episodes And God Created Woman and Cigarettes and Alcohol and Rollerblading.

Background
Henderson is from Dublin, Ireland. After graduating from Alexandra College secondary school, she began work as a secretary at Guinness. In 1983, she left Guinness to become an actor. She is married to Derek Seymour, an executive at Allied Irish Banks, with whom she has 4 children. She lives in Dún Laoghaire. Henderson is a Presbyterian.

Career
Henderson has worked mainly in theatre and television. As a teenager, she attended the Betty Ann Norton summer school. As an adult, she undertook training at the Dublin Oscar Theatre School of Acting from 1981 to 1982 and at Stefan Niedziałkowski's American School of Polish Mime from 1983 to 1984. She took an 11-year hiatus to raise her family.

Henderson has written several plays and has performed at the Peacock Theatre, Gaiety Theatre, Bewley's Café Theatre, and in the Dublin Fringe Festival. She was nominated for a Hennessy Literary Award for her short story The Box.

Filmography

References

External links 
 
 

21st-century Irish actresses
20th-century Irish actresses
Living people
Father Ted
People educated at Alexandra College
1961 births
21st-century Irish dramatists and playwrights
Irish Presbyterians
Irish television actresses